Batmönkhiin Uuuganbat (born 5 July 1997) is a Mongolian footballer who plays as a defender for Mongolian Premier League club Deren and the Mongolian national team.

References

1997 births
Living people
Mongolian footballers
Association football defenders